Imprisoned is a 2018 American thriller drama film written and directed by Paul Kampf and starring Laurence Fishburne, Juan Pablo Raba, Juana Acosta, Esai Morales, Jon Huertas, John Heard (in his final film after his death in 2017), and Edward James Olmos.

Cast
Laurence Fishburne as Daniel Calvin
Juan Pablo Raba as Dylan Burke
Juana Acosta as Maria
Edward James Olmos
John Heard
Esai Morales
Jon Huertas
Ana Isabelle

Production
The film was shot entirely in Puerto Rico in 2017 before Hurricane Maria hit.

Release
Cinema Libre Studio acquired North American distribution rights to the film in July 2019.

The film was released in theaters on September 13, 2019.

Reception
The film has  rating on Rotten Tomatoes.  Jeffrey M. Anderson of Common Sense Media awarded the film two stars out of five.  Alex Saveliev of Film Threat gave it a five out of ten.

References

External links
 
 

American thriller drama films
2018 thriller drama films
Films shot in Puerto Rico
2018 films
2010s English-language films
2010s American films